Tumba may refer to:

Places
 Tumba, Sweden, a town in Botkyrka, Sweden
 Tumba, Rwanda, a town in Rulindo District, Rwanda
 Tumba (Skopje), an ancient Neolithic settlement in North Macedonia
 Tumba (Vranje), a village in the Vranje municipality of southern Serbia
 Tumba Peak (Šar), a mountain peak in south-east Kosovo
 Tumba Peak (Belasica), a mountain peak where the borders of Bulgaria, Greece and the Republic of Macedonia meet
 , a mountain peak in western Bulgaria
 Lake Tumba, a lake in the Democratic Republic of the Congo
 Bara Tumba, an ancient living area from Neolithic times in the Republic of Macedonia
 Veluška Tumba, an ancient living area from Neolithic times in the Republic of Macedonia
 La Tumba (Caracas), an underground detention facility in Caracas, Venezuela
 Tumba Church, a church building in Tumba, Botkyrka, Sweden
 Tumba Ice Cap, covering the western half of Chavdar Peninsula

Music
 Tumba (music), a native musical form that is played in Aruba and Curaçao
 Tumba (drum), a kind of long, thin drum
 Tumbi, also called tumba, a traditional Punjabi musical instrument
 Tumba francesa (French tumba), a style of music brought from Haiti to Cuba following the Haitian slave rebellion of 1791
 Tumba or toomba, a resonator on Indian musical instruments such as the sitar and sarod

People
 Kevin Tumba (born 1991), Belgian basketball player
 Sven Tumba (1931–2011), former Swedish ice hockey and golf player
 Tumba Silva, Angolan boxer

Sports
 IFK Tumba FK, Swedish football club
 IFK Tumba Hockey, Swedish ice hockey club

Other
 Tumba Bruk, the printing company responsible for manufacturing of the Swedish krona banknotes, located in Tumba, Sweden
 Another spelling for Thumba, India's first rocket launching site
 Tumba (drink), a Nepalese alcoholic beverage made from fermented millet or other cereals
 Tumba (Kongo), stone figures that the Kongo people placed on the graves of powerful people
 La Tumba, a 1964 novel by José Agustín